

Jacob Theodore "Jack" Schwartz (January 9, 1930 – March 2, 2009) was an American mathematician, computer scientist, and professor of computer science at the New York University Courant Institute of Mathematical Sciences.  He was the designer of the SETL programming language and started the NYU Ultracomputer project. He founded the New York University Department of Computer Science, chairing it from 1964 to 1980.

Early life 
Schwartz was born in The Bronx, New York on January 9, 1930 to Ignatz and Hedwig Schwartz. He attended Stuyvesant High School and went on to City College of New York.

Education 
Schwartz received his B.S. (1949) from the City College of New York and his M.A. (1949) and Ph.D. in mathematics (1952) from Yale University. His doctoral thesis was entitled Linear Elliptic Differential Operators and his thesis advisor was Nelson Dunford.

Career 
Schwartz's research interests included the theory of linear operators, von Neumann algebras, quantum field theory, time-sharing, parallel computing, programming language design and implementation, robotics, set-theoretic approaches in computational logic, proof and program verification systems; multimedia authoring tools; experimental studies of visual perception; multimedia and other high-level software techniques for analysis and visualization of bioinformatic data.

Schwartz authored 18 books and more than 100 papers and technical reports. He was also the inventor of the Artspeak programming language, which historically ran on mainframes and produced graphical output using a single-color graphical plotter.

Schwartz served as chairman of the Computer Science Department (which he founded) at the Courant Institute of Mathematical Sciences, New York University, from 1969 to 1977.  He also served as chairman of the Computer Science Board of the National Research Council and was the former chairman of the National Science Foundation Advisory Committee for Information, Robotics and Intelligent Systems.  From 1986 to 1989, he was the director of DARPA's Information Science and Technology Office (DARPA/ISTO) in Arlington, Virginia.

Personal life
Schwartz was previously married to computer scientist Frances E. Allen from 1972 to 1982.

Publications
Nelson Dunford, Jacob T. Schwartz Linear Operators, Part I General Theory , Part II Spectral Theory, Self Adjoint Operators in Hilbert Space , Part III Spectral Operators 

Jacob T. Schwartz, Introduction to Matrices and Vectors, McGraw-Hill (1961)
Jacob T. Schwartz, Lectures on the Mathematical Method in Analytical Economics, Gordon and Breach (1961)
Jacob T. Schwartz, Relativity In Illustrations, New York University Press (1962)
Jacob T. Schwartz, Theory of money (Mathematics and its applications), Gordon and Breach (1965)
Jacob T. Schwartz, W-* algebras (Notes on mathematics and its applications), Gordon and Breach (1967),  
Jacob T. Schwartz (ed.), Mathematical Aspects of Computer Science, American Mathematical Society (1967)
Jacob T. Schwartz, Nonlinear Functional Analysis, Gordon and Breach (1968)
Jacob T. Schwartz, Differential Geometry and Topology, Gordon and Breach (1969)
 Schwartz, J.T.; Cocke, John, PROGRAMMING LANGUAGES AND THEIR COMPILERS : Preliminary Notes, Courant Institute of Mathematical Sciences, New York University, Second Revised Version, April 1970

Jacob T. Schwartz, Robert B. K. Dewar, Programming With Sets: An Introduction to Setl, Springer (November 1986), 
Jacob T. Schwartz, The Limits of Artificial Intelligence, found in the Encyclopedia of Artificial Intelligence, 2 vols., John Wiley and Songs, 1987
Jacob T. Schwartz, Mark Kac, and Gian-Carlo Rota, Discrete Thoughts:  Essays on Mathematics, Science, and Philosophy, Birkhäuser Boston; 2nd edition (January 11, 2008),

Awards and honors
Recipient Wilbur Cross Medal, Yale University
Townsend Harris Medal, City University of New York
Mayor's Medal for Contributions to Science and Technology, New York City, 1986
Leroy P. Steele Prize, American Mathematical Society, August 1981 (shared with N. Dunford)
Sloan Fellow, 1961–1962
Distinguished Lecturer at the following Universities:  University of California, Santa Barbara; Harvard University; MIT; Cornell University; University of Washington; University of Southern California; Trinity College, Dublin
 Elected to the National Academy of Sciences in 1976, and to the National Academy of Engineering in 2000.

References

External links
 A Symposium to Honor the Scientific Career of Jacob T. Schwartz (2004).

Parallel Computing Pioneers.

Jacob Schwartz
NAE page
Jacob T. Schwartz's personal web site
Martin Davis and Edmond Schonberg, "Jacob Theodore Schwartz", Biographical Memoirs of the National Academy of Sciences (2011)

1930 births
2009 deaths
20th-century American mathematicians
21st-century American mathematicians
Programming language designers
City College of New York alumni
Yale University alumni
Yale University faculty
Courant Institute of Mathematical Sciences faculty
Donegall Lecturers of Mathematics at Trinity College Dublin
Harvard University staff
Deaths from cancer in New York (state)
Deaths from liver cancer
Members of the United States National Academy of Sciences
Operator theorists
Mathematicians from New York (state)
Scientists from the Bronx